Cory Gregson (born 4 September 1996) is an Australian rules footballer who played for the Geelong Football Club in the Australian Football League (AFL).

Gregson was drafted with pick 47 in the 2014 AFL Draft, and made his debut in the first round of the 2015 AFL season against Hawthorn.

Gregson previously came to media attention in August 2013 when his school, Sacred Heart College, controversially would not permit him to make his league debut with the Glenelg Football Club due to him being required to play in an inter-school game against Rostrevor College.
He attended Sheidow Park Primary School in the southern suburbs of Adelaide. In Round 6, 2015 Gregson was nominated for the 2015 AFL Rising Star award after having 18 disposals and 3 goals against Collingwood.

Gregson was delisted at the end of the 2018 season after a long battle with his fitness and getting his injured foot back to full health.

In 2019, Gregson would rejoin Glenelg in the SANFL, where he would play in Glenelg's team that won the 2019 SANFL Grand Final.

References

External links

Living people
1996 births
Geelong Football Club players
Glenelg Football Club players
Australian rules footballers from South Australia
Reynella Football Club players
Brighton Districts and Old Scholars Football Club players
People educated at Sacred Heart College, Adelaide